Todd Harris (born June 4, 1970) is an American sports announcer and reporter for NBC Sports and NBCSN, with current duties focused in Olympic and extreme sports. A graduate of Brigham Young University with a bachelor's degree in communications and broadcast journalism, Harris' sports media career began in 1991 with ESPN. While employed there through 2007, his workload mainly consisted of college football, the X Games, and IndyCar, which included the role of lap-by-lap announcer for ABC's coverage of the 2005 Indianapolis 500. In the past, he has also contributed to Turner Sports' coverage of the NBA playoffs and the 1998 Winter Olympics.

Harris gained notoriety at a young age as the 15 year host of ESPN's coverage of the World's Strongest Man, hosting alongside 4x champion Bill Kazmeier. Harris was also given high profiled jobs with Hall of Famers Keith Jackson and Dan Fouts on the ABC college football game of the week.

NBC Sports currently uses Harris in a wide variety of assignments. He, and broadcast partner Todd Richards received high marks for their coverage of Shaun White's Gold medal final run in Pyeongchang, South Korea at the 2018 Olympic Winter Games.

Harris has also acted as host for the Tour de France and the network's coverage of the annual IronMan event in Kailua Kona, Hawaii. Todd Harris was the main play-by-play announcer for NBC's venture with both the World Series of Fighting and the Pro Fight League.

Starting in 2021, Harris splits the lead commentating duties with Leigh Diffey doing Supercross on NBCSN with Ricky Carmichael, Daniel Blair, and Will Christien.

Harris was announced as the new lead play-by-play voice of the SailGP world tour. He debuted in Bermuda in April 2021 with his contract with SailGP running through 2022. He would announce the series with seasoned sailors Freddie Carr and Stevie Morrison. Aly Vance would serve as an on course reporter. Shows aired in 175 countries and in the US on CBS Sports Network.

References 

Living people
1970 births
Brigham Young University alumni
American television reporters and correspondents
American television sports announcers
Olympic Games broadcasters
American television sports anchors
Bowling broadcasters
Cycling announcers
National Basketball Association broadcasters
Motorsport announcers
College football announcers
People from Salt Lake City